Maintenance therapy is a medical therapy that is designed to help a primary treatment succeed.  For example, maintenance chemotherapy may be given to people who have a cancer in remission in an attempt to prevent a relapse. This form of treatment is also a common approach for the management of many incurable, chronic diseases such as periodontal disease, Crohn's disease or ulcerative colitis.

References

External links
Maintenance Therapy for periodontal disease
Maintenance Therapy for intestinal inflammatory diseases

Medical treatments
Therapy